This is the discography and videography of Dutch girl group Luv'.

Discography

Studio albums

Select compilation albums

Extended plays 

 For You (Dureco/High Fashion Records, 1989)

Singles

Videography
 Back in Luv' (DVD, Princess Entertainment, 2006)

References

Discographies of Dutch artists
Pop music group discographies